Välimaa is a Finnish surname. Notable people with the surname include:

Jukka-Pekka Välimaa (born 1959), known as Kauko Röyhkä, Finnish rock musician and author
Kirsi Välimaa (born 1978), Finnish cross-country skier
Martti Välimaa (born 1989), Finnish-American football player
Tero Välimaa (born 1978), Finnish swimmer
Tommi Välimaa, Finnish ice hockey player
Verneri Välimaa (born 1993), Finnish-American soccer player

Finnish-language surnames